Ostrea stentina is a species of oysters, marine bivalve mollusks in the family Ostreidae, the oysters.

Fossil records
The fossil record of this species dates back to the Miocene (age range: 7.246 to 0.126 million years ago). These fossils have been found in Italy, Angola, Namibia and Algeria.

Distribution
This species has a Mediterranean distribution.

References

 Repetto G., Orlando F. & Arduino G. (2005): Conchiglie del Mediterraneo, Amici del Museo "Federico Eusebio", Alba, Italy

Ostrea
Bivalves described in 1826